Dudley S. Taft (born July 4, 1966, Washington, D.C.) is an American musician. Taft is a blues/rock musician who fronts the Dudley Taft Band and was a songwriting member of Seattle band Sweet Water and member and chief songwriter of Seattle, Washington-based rock band Second Coming. He is the great-great-grandnephew of United States President William Howard Taft.

Career

Sweet Water
Sweet Water, founded in 1990, released its first Record Sweet Water in 1993. The album was produced by Don Gilmore and mixed by Tim Palmer. The band toured behind the album opening up for Winger, Candlebox and Alice in Chains. The accompanying music video for the Head Down single was played on MTV’s 120 Minutes and was added to regular rotation on M2. The band’s music has been used on television in episodes of MTV’s “Daria”, “Amongst Friends” and “Road Rules”, among others. A second record was recorded in 1995, produced and mixed by Dave Jerden. Taft left the band during the 1995 sessions. Sweet Water was dropped later that year by record label East West/Elektra.

Second Coming
In 1995 Taft joined Travis Bracht, Johnny Bacolas and James Bergstrom to form Second Coming. Starting out as a cover band called “FTA”, they wrote songs throughout 1996 and played them live at their gigs. By 1997, they started playing the Seattle area under the name Second Coming. Later that year, the band signed a six record deal with Gary Gersch, then the president of Capitol Records. Their self-titled release resulted in two Rock Radio hits that both went to #16 and #11 on the Billboard Mainstream Rock Charts in 1997 and 1998. In 1998 and 1999 the band toured with VAST, Fuel, Candlebox and Monster Magnet.

Omnivoid
After leaving Second Coming in the early 2000s, Taft formed the band Omnivoid with singer Patrick Napper, bassist Robot, and drummer Andy Gregg. They released two studio EPs titled Combustion and Ignition respectively in 2005 and 2006 before moving on to other projects.

Dudley Taft Band

Taft started a blues/rock band in 2007 under his own name, with Scott Vogel on drums and Evan Sheeley on Bass. Their first CD, entitled "Left For Dead" was released in March 2010, with a mixture of originals and traditional blues covers. The album was given five stars by John Vermilyea of Blues Underground Network.  In 2011, Taft signed a two-record deal with the German-based label M.i.G. "Left For Dead" was released worldwide on August 26, 2011, with the addition of a bonus track "When The Levee Breaks".

Dudley Taft toured the Netherlands in January 2012. Reviews from bluesmagazine.nl, Keysandchords and more all rated ***** 5 stars for the "Left for Dead" CD. Taft then hired John Kessler to play bass and Chris Leighton to play drums for the next CD and live shows in Seattle and Europe. 
A DVD was released on March 5, 2012 called "Dudley Taft live at Highway 99," performed August 6, 2011 in Seattle, Washington.

On May 7, 2013, Taft released "Deep Deep Blue," his second blues rock studio album on his own label, American Blues Artist Group, and in Europe on M.i.G. Deep Deep Blue won the Best USA Blues Rock Album on the Underground Blues Network.
Taft made three HD videos for Deep Deep Blue, "The Waiting" directed by Alex Hoelscher, starring Alyssa Lynn James; "God Forbid" directed by Matthew Kreig, and "Meet Me In The Morning" by Matt Minnotte and David Molinatto.

In the fall of 2013 Taft moved to Cincinnati, Ohio with his wife Michelle and three daughters.

"Screaming In The Wind", produced by Tom Hambridge, was released in March 2014. The band toured the US and the EU May through September, playing the Netherlands, Germany, and Poland with John Kessler on Bass, Carl Martin on drums, and Eric Robert on Keyboards. Taft made three HD videos for Screaming In The Wind, "Screaming in The Wind," "Hard Time Killing Floor Blues," and "Sleeping In The Sunlight" all directed by Alex Hoelscher. The album made the top 10 Blues Rock albums of 2014 on the Blues Underground Network, and the song "Red Line" was the #1 single on the Hit Tracks Top 100.

In February 2015, Taft went to Nashville to record keyboard overdubs on the upcoming album "Skin and Bones" with legendary keyboardist Reese Wynans of Stevie Ray Vaughan fame. The band toured Europe again in April and March 2015, and released the fourth studio album "Skin and Bones" on October 16, 2015 on the American Blues Artist Group label. The song "Skin and Bones" charted #1 on the Hit Tracks Top 100 in Europe, and #2 on the Roots Music Report's Blues Rock Radio chart. Four HD video were shot for the album; "Skin and Bones", "Leland Mississippi Blues", "Lonesome Memphis Blues" and "One of These Days" by Alex Hoelscher. The first two videos were released at the end of 2015, and the second two in the first two months of 2016. Taft's music can be heard on Pandora, Spotify, Apple Music, and other streaming services, as well as Sirus/XM's Bluesville channel 70.

The album, "Live in Europe" was released in May 2016 with 13 tracks that were recorded during the 2014 and 2015 European tours in Vriezenveen, Netherlands and Kielce, Poland. Eight cover songs and five originals populate the cd, with "Broken Down" reaching the #1 spot on the Hit Tracks Top 100 chart in Europe.

Taft's fifth studio album, "Summer Rain" released on September 15, 2017 has the same lineup as "Skin and Bones" with the addition of Kasey Williams on Bass guitar. The album consists of eleven songs penned solely by Taft.

In the fall of 2017 Taft was nominated "Best Guitarist" by the European Blues Awards. In 2018, Taft and the band played a six-week tour of Europe, which included The Netherlands, Germany, Austria, Belgium, and France, playing clubs and festivals.

Taft toured Europe in September 2019 supporting the album "Simple Life." Darby Todd played drums on this tour, and Kasey Williams played bass.

Taft is scheduled to tour the EU in October 2022 to support the album "Cosmic Radio" which was released during the pandemic in September 2020.

Filmography

Television shows

Discography
Artist albums
1991: TER – CZ Records – Songwriter, Guitar, Vocals
1993: Sweet Water – Atlantic Records – Songwriter, Guitar, Vocals
1995: Superfriends – East West/Elektra Records – Songwriter, Guitar, Vocals
1998: Second Coming – Capitol Records – Producer, String Arrangement, Songwriter, Guitar, Vocals
2005: Combustion - Guitar
2006: Ignition - Guitar
2010: Left For Dead – Songwriter, Producer, Guitar, Vocals
2013: Deep Deep Blue – Songwriter, Producer, Guitar, Vocals
2014: Screaming In The Wind – Songwriter, Guitar, Vocals
2015: Skin and Bones – Songwriter, Producer, Guitar, Vocals
2016: Live in Europe – Songwriter, Producer, Guitar, Vocals
2017: Summer Rain – Songwriter, Producer, Guitar, Vocals
2019: Simple Life – Songwriter, Producer, Guitar, Vocals
2020: Cosmic Radio – Songwriter, Producer, Guitar, Vocals

Sources

[ Dudley Taft on Allmusic]
IQ Beats
Dudley Taft Signs Deal With MIG

References

External links
Dudley Taft
Sweet Water
[ Second Coming at the AMG]
[   Sweet Water at the AMG]

1966 births
Taft School alumni
Taft family
Living people
American rock musicians
American rock guitarists
American male guitarists
Second Coming (band) members
Songwriters from Washington, D.C.
American male songwriters
Guitarists from Washington, D.C.
20th-century American guitarists
20th-century American male musicians